Charity with Four Children is a sculpture by the Italian artist Gian Lorenzo Bernini. Executed between 1627 and 1628, the work is housed in the Vatican Museums in Vatican City. The small terracotta sculpture represents Charity breast-feeding a child, with three other children playing. There is an imprint of Bernini's thumbprint in the clay.

See also
List of works by Gian Lorenzo Bernini

Notes

References

External links
 Web Gallery of Art
 

1620s sculptures
Sculptures by Gian Lorenzo Bernini
Terracotta sculptures
Sculptures of children
Sculptures of the Vatican Museums
Sculptures of women